Cortlandt Starnes (March 31, 1864 – May 28, 1934) was the 7th Commissioner of the Royal Canadian Mounted Police, from April 1, 1923 to July 31, 1931.

He died in St. Hilaire, Quebec on May 28, 1934 and is buried in Cote des Neiges Cemetery, Montreal.

References
 

1864 births
1934 deaths
Canadian anti-communists
Royal Canadian Mounted Police commissioners